Beginners is the title given to the manuscript version of Raymond Carver's 1981 short story collection What We Talk About When We Talk About Love, published by Carver's widow Tess Gallagher in 2009.

The Stories
 Why Don't You Dance?
 Viewfinder
 Where is Everyone?
 Gazebo
 Want to See Something?
 The Fling
 A Small, Good Thing
 Tell the Women We're Going
 If It Please You
 So Much Water So Close to Home
 Dummy
 Pie
 The Calm
 Mine
 Distance
 Beginners
 One More Thing

Publications
 Carver, Raymond. Beginners. London: Chatto Bodley Head & Cape (2009)	
 Carver, Raymond. Collected Stories. New York: Library of America (2009).
 Carver, Raymond. Beginners. New York: Vintage Contemporaries (2015)

Short story collections by Raymond Carver
2009 short story collections
Jonathan Cape books